This list of protected areas of Gribskov Municipality lists protected areas of Gribskov Municipality, Denmark.

List

See also

References

Gribskov Municipality
Gribskov